Deborah Mary O'Neill (born 4 June 1961) is an Australian politician who has served as a Senator for New South Wales since 2013. Before entering politics O'Neill was a school teacher and university academic. She is a member of the Australian Labor Party and formerly represented the seat of Robertson as a member of the House of Representatives from 2010 to 2013.

Early life
O'Neill was born on 4 June 1961 in Parramatta, New South Wales. She grew up in Western Sydney, one of six children born to Irish Catholic immigrants Mary and Jim O'Neill; her mother was born in Thomastown and her father in Cork. She held Irish citizenship by descent until renouncing it prior to the 2010 election.

O'Neill attended Catholic primary schools in Marayong and Girraween and high school at St Patrick's College, Campbelltown. She began an arts degree, but withdrew when her younger sister, Helen, was diagnosed with acute myeloid leukemia. With her passing, O'Neill returned to tertiary studies, fulfilling a promise she made to her sister to become a teacher. 

O'Neill completed a Bachelor of Arts at the University of Sydney and University of New England, a Diploma of Teaching and Master of Arts at Australian Catholic University, and a graduate diploma at Deakin University.

Before entering politics, O'Neill worked as a high school teacher and academic in the Faculty of Education and Arts at The University of Newcastle, Central Coast Campus. O'Neill taught at Mercy Catholic College Chatswood - where she met her fellow teacher Paul - then at St Edward's College, East Gosford, and Corpus Christi College. She moved to the Central Coast after she and Paul married.

Political career

State politics 
O'Neill began her political life in New South Wales, challenging the Liberal Party's Chris Hartcher for the seat of Gosford in the state election of 2003, reducing his margin to 272 votes. She challenged Hartcher again in the 2007 NSW election, this time in the newly created seat of Terrigal, but was defeated.

National politics 

Entering Federal Politics, O'Neill was chosen as Labor candidate for Robertson gaining preselection over incumbent Labor member, Belinda Neal. She went on to win the seat for Labor at the 2010 Australian federal election, defeating the Liberal candidate Darren Jameson, and increasing Labor's margin by 1 point. She served with Labor under Prime Minister Julia Gillard, joining Committees Health and Ageing and on Education and Employment. At the 2013 election, O'Neill suffered a 4-point swing against her, being defeated by the Liberals' Lucy Wicks. Her legacy from this time in office being the construction of a cancer clinic for the local region.

Senate career

Becoming a Senator, in 44th Parliament 
O'Neill re-entered the Parliament of Australia a few weeks after the 2013 election, only as a Senator for NSW. This followed Bob Carr's resignation from the Senate on 24 October 2013, both of that term and the following six-year term. As vacant Senate positions are filled by the respective state or territory, the matter was resolved by a joint sitting of NSW Parliament, which took four minutes, with the President of the Legislative Council appointing O'Neill to the Senate, in the term which had begun on 1 July. O'Neill joined the Senate on the opposition benches of the 44th Parliament of Australia serving on the Joint Standing Committee on Foreign Affairs, Defence and Trade. Her anticipated six-year term did not eventuate due to the double dissolution of parliament in 2016.

Senator and Shadow Minister in 45th Parliament 
Regardless, O'Neill was elected to the Senate in her own right in the 2016 Australian federal election. In the first sitting of the new Senate she was chosen to be one of the six-year senators in accordance with Section 13 of the Constitution. Serving under Opposition Leader Bill Shorten, she was appointed as Shadow Assistant Minister for Mental Health and Shadow Assistant Minister for Innovation. During this time in Parliament, O'Neill was named as one of several women "Who Are Absolutely Done Listening To Men.

Senator in 46th Parliament 
O'Neill continued to serve from opposition benches, but now under the leadership of Labor leader Anthony Albanese. She was appointed to the Joint Standing Committee on Foreign Affairs, Defence and Trade; and the Joint Statutory Committee on Corporations and Financial Services. Using this position she pressured Australian Securities & Investments Commission to investigate AMP Limited for unfair contracts with financial planners. She also accused AMP Limited, EY and KPMG of allowing sexual harassment and bullying in their organisations, and challenged a member of the Fair Work Commission for displaying sexualised waifus in a government office.

Senator on Government benches, in 47th Parliament 
In the run up to the 2022 Australian federal election, O'Neill defeated Kristina Keneally for the top Senate Position for Labor, campaigned in regional and metropolitan NSW and was returned to the Senate for a second time. Prime Minister Anthony Albanese appointed her to the committees for Treaties, for Corporations and Financial Services and for Foreign Affairs, Defence and Trade – which she chairs. O'Neill has asserted Labor's commitment to introducing new laws, in 47th Parliament of Australia, allowing faith-based schools to select staff of that faith.

Political views
O'Neill is reported to carry two items in her handbag: rosary beads and a copy of the Universal Declaration of Human Rights. She has described politics as her way of giving action to faith. O'Neill is known to be part of the socially conservative Right faction of the Labor Party. She has been quoted as saying, “My faith and my belief about people is absolutely embedded in my politics."  

Along with Senator James Paterson and Peter Khalil, O'Neill is a member of the Inter-Parliamentary Alliance on China, she is the Oceania representative for the International Parliamentary Network for Education (IPNEd), and a delegate to the International Parliamentary Union (IPU). 

Her notable positions have been:

 Hawkish on China, criticising China's leadership on matters of human rights and religious freedom.
 Supportive of workers rights, advocating for the benefits of entitlements that come with fulltime positions for staff.
 Conservative on marriage, saying "I believe in the traditional definition of marriage."
 Strong advocate for Science, technology, engineering, and mathematics.

 Concerned at the growing divide between religious and non-religious Australians. She called for a greater focus on religious studies in schools in order to further cultural literacy. 
 Opposed to euthanasia.

Personal life
O'Neill has three children with her husband Paul and lives on the Central Coast.

References

External links
  
 Summary of parliamentary voting for Senator Deborah O'Neill on TheyVoteForYou.org.au

1961 births
Living people
Politicians from Sydney
Australian Labor Party members of the Parliament of Australia
Labor Right politicians
Members of the Australian Senate
Members of the Australian Senate for New South Wales
Members of the Australian House of Representatives
Members of the Australian House of Representatives for Robertson
Women members of the Australian House of Representatives
Women members of the Australian Senate
Academic staff of the University of Newcastle (Australia)
Australian people of Irish descent
People from Parramatta
21st-century Australian politicians
21st-century Australian women politicians
People who lost Irish citizenship
Citizens of Ireland through descent
Australian schoolteachers
Australian Catholic University alumni